The Australian Jewish community has only one major hard copy weekly publication, The Australian Jewish News, but has a long history of boutique publications and zines. With the advent of the internet, blogs and online magazines have proliferated reflecting the community's multitudinous religious, political, and cultural orientations.

AJN and other news sources
The primary Australian Jewish news source is The Australian Jewish News (also known as The AJN), a hard copy weekly that also produces a website; owned by Robert Magid and edited by Zeddy Lawrence.

Its major rival is an online news magazine, J-Wire, which publishes similar content. It is owned and operated by Henry Benjamin.

A recent entry into the market is the free monthly hard copy newspaper, The Jewish Report, which bills itself as a tool for fostering social cohesion.'

Literary publications
Alongside zines, and other community newsletters, Melbourne Jewry produced two literary journals, the Melbourne Chronicle, in the 1980s and Generation Magazine. The Melbourne Chronicle initially produced a companion Yiddish edition; however, like the Australian Jewish News, which also published additional material in Yiddish, the dwindling Yiddish-speaking market proved incapable of supporting it.

After Generation Magazine ceased publication in the 1990s, there was a period in which there was no dedicated publication for Australian Jewish literary expression. In 2009, however, a group of young Jewish writers launched the online magazine, Galus Australis. It billed itself as a pluralist space for the discussion of Jewish Australian ideas and stories, but it ceased publication in 2015.

Jewish Women of Words is the newest literary venture in the Australian Jewish media scene.

Jewish blogs
Australian Jewry's religious and political diversity is best reflected in its blogs. The conservative collective blog, known as Jews Down Under/ publishes opinion pieces arguing from a right wing Zionist perspective; while the Australian Jewish Democratic Society and +61J publish content more critical of the Israeli government.

Notable individual blogs have similarly provided the community with a platform for expression. The first such blog, in 2009, to be reported in the wider Australian media was The Sensible Jew, written by Alex Fein. It provided controversial critiques of communal politics. Blogs such as Pitputim and The Fifth Chelek, meanwhile, concern themselves more with religious argument.

Radio and television
Radio and television have also provided the Jewish community with a broadcast outlet. The long running TV show, The Shtick, first airing on channel 31 and then moving to YouTube, features stories and segments about Jewish life in Melbourne. Melbourne Jewish Radio has also had a long tradition and the SBS station currently provides a service in Hebrew. The community attained a radio licence in 2011 and established the station, LionFM; however, this was short lived as its license was revoked. In its place is the community run radio organisation, J-Air, which bills itself as, 'the Jewish voice of Melbourne'.

References

Jews and Judaism in Australia
Mass media in Australia